McAlister Place is a pedestrian zone that runs through a section of Tulane University's uptown New Orleans campus.  Construction of the walkway began on May 18, 2009, and was completed in January 2010.  It replaced McAlister Drive, which was an asphalt-paved private road with one-way vehicular traffic and  parking on both sides, running from Freret Street to Willow Street.

The project is part of Tulane's commitment to and effort toward environmental sustainability.  The Freeman School of Business's trading room and the Lavin-Bernick Center for University Life overlook the newly completed McAlister Place.

External links
McAlister Place blueprint <--Broken link, July 2016.
McAlister Place project website

See also
List of streets of New Orleans

References

Streets in New Orleans
Tulane University
Pedestrian malls in the United States